The following list includes all of the Canadian Register of Historic Places listings in Vancouver, British Columbia.

Vancouver
Historic places